One third of Colchester City Council in Essex, England is elected each year, followed by one year without election. Since the last boundary changes at the 2016 election, 51 councillors have been elected from 17 wards.

Political control

Current composition

As of 15 December 2022, the council's composition is:

Council control

Since the first election to the council in 1973 political control of the council has been held by the following parties:

Elections

Detailed results of these elections are shown in the table below. Boundary changes took place for the 1990, 2002 and 2016 elections leading to the whole council being elected on those years.

Leadership
The leaders of the council since 2008 have been:

Results maps

By-election results
By-elections occur when seats become vacant between council elections. Below is a summary of by-elections from 1997 onwards; full by-election results can be found by clicking on the by-election name.

Notes

References

By-election results

External links
Colchester Borough Council

 
Council elections in Essex
District council elections in England